Gorle may refer to:

People
 F. H. Gorle (died 1931), British social democratic activist
 Robert Vaughan Gorle (1896–1937), English recipient of the Victoria Cross
 Terry Alan Gorle (1959–), American guitarist and composer, founder of the band Heir Apparent

Places
 Gorle, Lombardy, Italy
 Görle, Karacasu, Turkey